Amoana is a genus of flowering plants belonging to the family Orchidaceae.

Its native range is Southwestern Mexico.

Species:

Amoana kienastii 
Amoana latipetala

References

Orchids
Orchid genera